The Simadal Fjord is a branch of the Eid Fjord in the municipality of Eidfjord in Vestland, Norway. The Simadal Fjord is the innermost branch of the Hardanger Fjord.

The Kjeåsen mountain farm lies on the mountain slope north of the mouth of the fjord. Below Kjeåsen is the Sima Hydroelectric Power Station, which has its outlet into the fjord. Norwegian County Road 103 runs along the south side of the fjord and continues into the Sima Valley.

References

Fjords of Vestland
Eidfjord